Tsujimoto (written: 辻本 or 辻元) is a Japanese surname. Notable people with the surname include:

, Japanese boxer
, Japanese businessman
, Japanese politician
, Japanese footballer
, fictitious Japanese hockey player
, Japanese actor and musical artist
, Japanese professional wrestler

Fictional characters
, a character in the Japanese manga series You're Under Arrest
Taro Tsujimoto, a fictional Japanese ice hockey player

Japanese-language surnames